Jacob Prickett Jr. Log House is a historic home located near Montana, Marion County, West Virginia.  It was built in 1781, and is a two-story, rectangular log structure with a gable roof.  It has a sandstone-walled cellar.

It was listed on the National Register of Historic Places in 1979.

See also
Prickett's Fort State Park

References

Houses on the National Register of Historic Places in West Virginia
Houses completed in 1781
Houses in Marion County, West Virginia
National Register of Historic Places in Marion County, West Virginia
Log buildings and structures on the National Register of Historic Places in West Virginia